The 2006 Frankfurt Galaxy season was the 14th season for the franchise in the NFL Europe  League (NFLEL). The team was led by head coach Mike Jones in his third year, and played its home games at Commerzbank Arena in Frankfurt, Germany. They finished the regular season in second place with a record of seven wins and three losses. In World Bowl XIV, Frankfurt defeated the Amsterdam Admirals 22–7. The victory marked the franchise's fourth World Bowl championship, a league record.

Offseason

Free agent draft

Personnel

Staff

Roster

Schedule

Standings

Game summaries

Week 1: at Rhein Fire

Week 2: vs Hamburg Sea Devils

Week 3: at Amsterdam Admirals

Week 4: vs Cologne Centurions

Week 5: at Hamburg Sea Devils

Week 6: vs Berlin Thunder

Week 7: at Cologne Centurions

Week 8: vs Rhein Fire

Week 9: vs Amsterdam Admirals

Week 10: at Berlin Thunder

World Bowl XIV

Honors
After the completion of the regular season, the All-NFL Europe League team was selected by the NFLEL coaching staffs, members of a media panel and fans voting online at NFLEurope.com. Overall, Frankfurt had five players selected. The selections were:

 Brandon Haw, safety
 Aaron Hosack, wide receiver
 Jerome Nichols, defensive tackle
 Roger Robinson, running back
 Will Svitek, tackle

Head coach Mike Jones earned NFL Europe League Coach of the Year honors.

Notes

References

Frankfurt
Frankfurt Galaxy seasons